Legislative elections were held in Indonesia on 23 April 1987, to elect 400 of the 500 members of the People's Representative Council (DPR), the national legislature. The election was the fifth legislative election in the country since independence and the fourth legislative election under President Suharto's New Order. The election resulted in an outright majority for Golkar, which retained its status as the ruling party of the country.

According to the General Elections Institution, the election campaign began on 24 March and ended on 18 April, with a four-day election silence up until election day on 22 April. In addition, the New Order regime also implemented a number of regulations which benefited Golkar. These include a ban on the formation of party branches below the provincial level, a reduction in the campaign period (from 45 to 25 days), and a ban on criticism of government policies.

Golkar, like in all other elections during the New Order, won an outright majority of the vote, defeating both opposition parties, and retaining its status as the ruling political party. It increased its share of votes from 64.34% to 73.11%, and it's share of seats increasing from 242 seats to 299 seats. The result for the opposition was mixed. While the United Development Party (PPP) saw both its share of votes and share of seats decline, from 27.78% to just 15.96% and from 94 to 61 seats; The Indonesian Democratic Party (PDI) had their best showing up until that point, as it increased its performance by 16 seats, and 3.05% of the popular vote.

Background
In the elections of 1977 and 1982, the notionally Islamic United Development Party (PPP) had seen a steady increase in its share of the vote, despite the New Order government's restrictions on political activity. It managed to position itself as the party of the "little people."  In 1984, with the agreement of the government, under the leadership of Abdurrahman Wahid, the Nahdlatul Ulama (NU) left the PPP, which it had been forced to join under the 1973 fusion of the Islamic parties.

Later that year, the government obliged all political parties to adopt the state philosophy Pancasila as their ideological basis. In 1985 the PPP was pressured to change the party symbol from the Kaaba, the building at the center of the al-Masjid al-Haram in Mecca, Saudi Arabia, to the star from the official symbol for Pancasila.

In 1987, the NU leadership declared that its members and supporters were "not obliged to vote for the PPP, and not forbidden to vote for Golkar". This had the effect of increasing the influence of the NU, which had been much diminished within the PPP.

Timeline of events

Campaign

Golkar 
The priority of Golkar was to secure a majority of the popular vote in the devoutly Islamic province of Aceh, the only province apart from Jakarta where it had failed to do so in 1982. In order to achieve this, Golkar made use of two civil servants to run its financial campaign: the managing director of state-owned oil company Pertamina and the head of the state-owned logistics agency BULOG. Local companies, much more heavily dependent on government contracts then in the past, were the biggest donors. However, the crucial factor for Golkar was the political leadership of Aceh governor Ibrahim Hasan, an economist who managed to unite the traditional and modern aspirations of the Acehnese people. He traveled around the province telling people that a Golkar victory would bring about material development without sacrificing traditional values.

PDI
In the final days of the campaign, thousands of young supporters of the Indonesian Democratic Party (PDI) paraded in Jakarta carrying portraits of former president Sukarno. In their eyes, the anti-Western Sukarno was associated with the Indonesian National Party (PNI), one of the parties forced to fuse into the PDI in 1973, and was therefore a clear symbol of opposition to the pro-Western New Order. During the campaign, the PDI had tried to take a stand against corruption and economic inequality.

Radio and television campaigns
The government of Indonesia had arranged a campaign for the government-appointed central board of the political parties to speak publicly in the television and radio. The broadcasting rights for this digital campaign were held by the TVRI for the televised campaigns, and the RRI for the radio campaigns. The recording of the campaign was held in the respective studios. Only national and private radios and television were allowed relay the campaign on the whole, while individual and organizational radios and television were not permitted to relay the campaign.

Results
As a result of the withdrawal of the NU, the PPP lost more than 40% of its 1982 vote, with Golkar seeing the most benefit. The PPP vote fell in 24 or the 27 provinces. The PDI share of the vote rose by 3%, with its share up by more than a third over 1982. Most of the increases came in western Java, and in Jakarta, the PDI's vote rose to 28.8% from 15.8% in 1982. With the conflicts with the PPP following the departure of the NU, voting for the PDI was the only way of registering a protest against the domination by the military-bureaucracy of the political system. Golkar, meanwhile, achieved its aim in Aceh, and for the first time won an absolute majority of the vote in Jakarta and every other province of Indonesia. This would be the case for every election until the 1998 collapse of the New Order.

Aftermath 

After the election the next item on the political agenda was the election of the president and vice-president by the People's Consultative Assembly. The reelection of 66-year-old Suharto was a foregone conclusion given he appointed half the membership of the assembly as well as controlling the elected Golkar members and the unelected delegates from the Armed Forces. This added up to 80% of the membership. The only question was who would Suharto appoint as vice president. Eventually the post went to Golkar chairman and State Secretary/Minister Sudharmono. In March 1988 the two men were formally elected and inaugurated for the 1988–1993 term.

Notes

References

Citations

Sources 

 
 Evans, Kevin Raymond (2003) The History of Political Parties and general Elections in Indonesia Arise Consultancies, Jakarta 
 Komisi Pemilihan Umum (General Election Commission) retrieved 6 January 2008
 Liddle, R. William (1994) Pemilu-Pemilu Orde Baru (Elections of the New Order), LP3ES, Jakarta  
Nohlen, Dieter, Grotz, Florian & Hartmann, Christof (2001) Elections in Asia: A data handbook, Volume II 
 Schwartz, Adam (1994) A Nation in Waiting: Indonesia in the 1990s, Allen & Unwin. 
 Sudibjo, M (Ed) (1995) Pemilihan Umum 1992: Suatu Evaluasi (The 1992 General Election: An Evaluation) Center for Strategic and International Studies, Jakarta. 

Legislative elections in Indonesia
New Order (Indonesia)
1987 in Indonesia
Indonesia
People's Consultative Assembly
April 1987 events in Asia
Election and referendum articles with incomplete results